Miles Teves (born 1963, Salinas, California) is a Hollywood artist and conceptual designer who works on television productions, films, and computer games.

Career
Miles Teves did the technical art for the role-playing game, SkyRealms of Jorune (1984). Since then, his work has been more for the silver screen. Some of his credits include Explorers, RoboCop, The Witches of Eastwick, Total Recall, Batman & Robin, Hollow Man, Spider-Man, Terminator 3: Rise of the Machines, Reign of Fire, Van Helsing, Pirates of the Caribbean: The Curse of the Black Pearl, and The Chronicles of Riddick.

He studied sculpture at the Art Center College of Design before being discovered by Rob Bottin who hired Teves to work on Darkness for Legend. He has sculpted pieces as realistic as Tom Cruise's head for Interview with the Vampire and as fantastical as Kong in King Kong.

Some of his latest projects are Little Fockers, which was released in December 2010, and Pirates of the Caribbean: On Stranger Tides, which was released in May 2011.

References

External links

Miles Teves homepage

1963 births
American sculptors
American make-up artists
Living people
Role-playing game artists